The 1946 Commonwealth Prime Ministers' Conference was the second Meeting of the Heads of Government of the British Commonwealth. It was held in the United Kingdom in from April to May 1946, and was hosted by that country's Prime Minister, Clement Attlee.

Discussions were primarily related to political and economic settlements arising from the end of World War II. The final communiqué expressed the Commonwealth's support for the creation of the United Nations as an instrument for peace and security as well as for raising the standard of living and the promotion of democratic liberty throughout the world.

This was the final Prime Ministers' Conference consisting only of the "Old Commonwealth" of majority white nations and white-led South Africa.

Ireland did not participate although at the time the British Commonwealth still regarded Ireland as one of its members. Neutral Ireland considered it inappropriate to attend on the basis that the Conference was "discussing matters relating to the war". Ireland had not participated in any equivalent conferences since 1932.

Participants

References

1946
Diplomatic conferences in the United Kingdom
20th-century diplomatic conferences
1946 in international relations
1946 in London
United Kingdom and the Commonwealth of Nations
1946 in the British Empire
1946 conferences
British Empire in World War II
April 1946 events in the United Kingdom
May 1946 events in the United Kingdom
1940s in the City of Westminster
Clement Attlee
William Lyon Mackenzie King
Jan Smuts